Ibón Pérez Arrieta (born 9 June 1977) is a Spanish former professional footballer who played as a striker, currently manager of Juventud de Torremolinos CF.

A journeyman, he played for 18 clubs in six countries.

Club career
Arrieta was born in San Sebastián, Gipuzkoa. In his country, he could never play in higher than the Segunda División B in his beginnings, moving in 2001 to Iberian Peninsula neighbours Portugal with G.D. Chaves where he scored at incredible rate, always in the Segunda Liga. He had also spells in the country's Primeira Liga, with S.C. Braga and G.D. Estoril Praia.

Arrieta returned in 2005 to his homeland, joining Segunda División side Racing de Ferrol, but again had no luck, appearing in less than one quarter of the season's matches as his team was also relegated. He then played in quick succession for CD Logroñés, Maccabi Herzliya FC, PAS Giannina FC and UD Melilla.

In the summer of 2007, following a successful trial which included a preseason mini-tour of Austria, Arrieta agreed to a two-year deal at Football League One club Swindon Town. He made his official debut as a second-half substitute on the opening day draw at Northampton Town, and scored his first goal in the Football League Trophy against Brentford, executing an overhead kick in a 4–1 win.

In January 2008, however, Arrieta left Swindon and signed a contract with Romania's CS Pandurii Târgu Jiu, leaving after two and a half seasons as a free agent with a maximum of ten Liga I games played (in 2009–10). He continued to compete in Spanish amateur football well into his 40s, mainly in representation of Juventud de Torremolinos CF where he later worked as manager and director of football.

Career statistics

References

External links

1977 births
Living people
Spanish footballers
Footballers from San Sebastián
Association football forwards
Segunda División players
Segunda División B players
Tercera División players
Divisiones Regionales de Fútbol players
Real Sociedad B footballers
Racing de Ferrol footballers
CD Logroñés footballers
UD Melilla footballers
CD El Palo players
Primeira Liga players
Liga Portugal 2 players
G.D. Chaves players
S.C. Braga players
G.D. Estoril Praia players
Israeli Premier League players
Maccabi Herzliya F.C. players
PAS Giannina F.C. players
English Football League players
Swindon Town F.C. players
Liga I players
CS Pandurii Târgu Jiu players
Spanish expatriate footballers
Expatriate footballers in Portugal
Expatriate footballers in Israel
Expatriate footballers in Greece
Expatriate footballers in England
Expatriate footballers in Romania
Spanish expatriate sportspeople in Portugal
Spanish expatriate sportspeople in Israel
Spanish expatriate sportspeople in Greece
Spanish expatriate sportspeople in England
Spanish expatriate sportspeople in Romania
Spanish football managers
Tercera División managers
Segunda Federación managers
Tercera Federación managers